The Catalunya GP2 round was a GP2 Series race that ran from on the Circuit de Catalunya track in Montmeló, Catalonia, Spain.

Winners

Notes

References

GP2 Series rounds